The qualification for the 2013 FIVB Women's Junior World Championship was held from 7–12 May 2013.

Competing nations

Participating teams
 Host
 
 
 
 
 Qualified through 2012 Women's Junior European Volleyball Championship

Pools

Pool A
Matches of Pool A were played in Subotica, Serbia.

Pool B
Matches of Pool B were played in  Cividale del Friuli, Italy.

Pool C
Matches of Pool C will be played in Samokov, Bulgaria.

Pool D
Matches of Pool D will be played in Ramenskoye, Russia.

References

2013 in volleyball
2013 in women's volleyball
Volleyball
Volleyball
Volleyball
Volleyball
International women's volleyball competitions hosted by Italy
International volleyball competitions hosted by Serbia
International volleyball competitions hosted by Russia
International volleyball competitions hosted by Bulgaria
Qualification for volleyball competitions